Neocrepidodera ligurica is a species of flea beetle from Chrysomelidae family that can be found in France and Italy.

References

Beetles described in 1904
Beetles of Europe
ligurica